Frederick Ricker Brokaw (August 25, 1879 – death date unknown) was an American Negro league second baseman in the 1900s.

Brokaw played for the Cuban X-Giants in 1904, and for the Brooklyn Royal Giants the following season. In three recorded career games, he posted one hit in 12 plate appearances.

References

External links
Baseball statistics and player information from Baseball-Reference Black Baseball Stats and Seamheads

1879 births
Place of birth missing
Year of death missing
Place of death missing
Brooklyn Royal Giants players
Cuban X-Giants players